Liu Shaobin (born August 1963) is a Chinese diplomat, currently serving as Chinese Ambassador to Turkey.

Early life and education
Liu was born in August 1963, and graduated from the Department of Japanese, Wuhan University.

Political career
Liu joined the Foreign Service and has served primarily in East Asia. In 2018, he became director of the Department of Foreign Security Affairs of the Ministry of Foreign Affairs.

In October 2020, President Xi Jinping appointed him Chinese Ambassador to Turkey according to the decision of the 13th National People's Congress Standing Committee, succeeding Deng Li.

References

1963 births
Living people
Wuhan University alumni
Ambassadors of China to Turkey